Hendrickson is an unincorporated community in northern Butler County, Missouri, United States. It is located along Missouri Route O approximately one mile south of U.S. Route 67. It is approximately ten miles north of Poplar Bluff, within the Mark Twain National Forest. The community of Wilby lies three miles to the southeast along Route O. It sits on the east margin of the Black River floodplain. The Missouri Pacific Railway passes the west side of the community along the Black River floodplain.

Hendrickson was laid out in 1873 when the railroad was extended to that point, and named after Nathan Henrickson, the original owner of the town site.  A post office called Hendrickson was established in 1875, and remained in operation until 1975.

References

Unincorporated communities in Butler County, Missouri
Unincorporated communities in Missouri